Julian Halls (born 17 April 1967) is a British former field hockey player who competed in the 1996 Summer Olympics and in the 2000 Summer Olympics. He represented England and won a bronze medal in the men's hockey, at the 1998 Commonwealth Games in Kuala Lumpur. He played club hockey in the Netherlands for Haagsche Delftsche Mixed.

References

External links
 
 

1967 births
Living people
British male field hockey players
Olympic field hockey players of Great Britain
Field hockey players at the 1996 Summer Olympics
Field hockey players at the 2000 Summer Olympics
1998 Men's Hockey World Cup players
People educated at Alleyn Court School
Commonwealth Games medallists in field hockey
Commonwealth Games bronze medallists for England
Haagsche Delftsche Mixed players
English expatriate sportspeople in the Netherlands
Expatriate field hockey players
Field hockey players at the 1998 Commonwealth Games
1990 Men's Hockey World Cup players
Medallists at the 1998 Commonwealth Games